Jesús Romeo Gorría (19 September 1916 – 2 April 2001) was a Spanish politician who served as Minister of Labour of Spain between 1962 and 1969, during the Francoist dictatorship.

References

1916 births
2001 deaths
Labour ministers of Spain
Francoist Spain